Alexander  Joseph Cory Scoles (30 November 1844 – 29 December 1920) was an architect and Roman Catholic priest. He designed many lancet style Gothic Revival 
churches in the south of England and was the son of Joseph John Scoles and brother of Ignatius Scoles.

Life
Alexander Scoles, like his brother Ignatius Scoles, was born in Hammersmith, London. He was the third son of the architect  Joseph John Scoles, whose  works included the Roman  Catholic
churches of the  Immaculate Conception in Farm Street, London,  Saint Francis Xavier in 
Liverpool and St Ignatius in Preston, Lancashire.

His eldest brother, Ignatius, became a Catholic, joining the Jesuits on 9 October 1860. Alexander Scoles followed him in becoming  a priest, but not a Jesuit, instead he joined the Diocese of Clifton, later becoming a canon.

He studied as an architect under the direction of his father, until the latter's death in 1863. After that  Scoles became a pupil of Samuel Joseph Nicholl (1826–1903). His early professional work was done in partnership  with his cousin John Myrie Cory (1846–1893).

Initially he was parish priest in Bridgwater and on 26 September  1891, he became parish priest of the Church of the Holy Ghost in Yeovil. He moved from Yeovil and the Diocese of Clifton in 1901 and became a parish priest in Basingstoke. He died in the Hospital of St John and St Elizabeth on 29 December 1920 in London and is buried in the grounds of Holy Ghost Church in Basingstoke.

Works
His works include:
 St Joseph's on the Quay, Bridgwater (1882) 
 Immaculate Conception Church, Clevedon (1887)
 St Monica's Priory, Spetisbury (1891)
 Holy Ghost Church, Yeovil (1891)
 St Joseph's Church, Weston-super-Mare (1893) extended.
 Our Lady Star of the Sea Church, Ilfracombe (1893)
 St Francis of Assisi Church, Handsworth (1894)
 Sacred Heart and St Aldhelm Church, Sherborne
 St Peter-in-Chains Church, Stroud Green (1894)
 St Peter's Church, Cirencester (1895) 
 St Thomas of Canterbury Church, Woodford Green (1895)
 St Francis Church, Ascot, Berkshire (1900)
 Holy Ghost Church, Basingstoke (1901)
 Holy Redeemer Church, Keyham, Devon
 Our Lady Help of Christians and St Helen's Church, Westcliff-on-Sea (1903)
 Holy Trinity Church, Newquay (1903)
 Holy Ghost and St Stephen Church, Shepherd's Bush, London (1903–4)
 Holy Spirit and St Edward Church, Swanage (1904)
 Cathedral of St John the Evangelist, Portsmouth (1906)
 St Joseph's Church, Brighton (1906)
 Our Lady of Loreto and St Winefride's Church, Kew (1906)
 Our Lady and St Michael Church, Dorchester, Dorset (1906–7)
 Holy Cross Church, Plymouth (1907)
 St Agatha Church, Dawlish (1907–9)
 Sacred Heart and St Ia Church, St Ives, Cornwall (1908)
 Our Lady of Lourdes with St Swithun Church, Southsea (1908)
 St Edward the Confessor Church, Plymouth (1910)
 Church of the Immaculate Conception, Liphook (1911)
 St James the Less and St Helen Church, Colchester, church hall (1911)
 Holy Ghost Church, Exmouth (1915)
 St Joseph Church, Newton Abbot (1915)

Gallery

See also
 Joseph John Scoles
 Ignatius Scoles

References

English ecclesiastical architects
Gothic Revival architects
1844 births
1920 deaths
Architects from London